Robert Michael Waszgis (born August 24, 1970) is a former Major League Baseball player. He batted and threw right-handed.

He was drafted by the Baltimore Orioles in the 10th round of the 1991 amateur draft.

External links

1970 births
Living people
Baseball players from Nebraska
Fort Scott Greyhounds baseball players
Major League Baseball catchers
Sportspeople from Omaha, Nebraska
Texas Rangers players
Albany Polecats players
Bluefield Orioles players
Bowie Baysox players
Calgary Cannons players
American expatriate baseball players in Canada
Columbus Clippers players
Frederick Keys players
Jacksonville Suns players
Kane County Cougars players
Oklahoma RedHawks players
Pawtucket Red Sox players
Rochester Red Wings players
McNeese Cowboys baseball players